NGC 7419 is an open cluster in the constellation Cepheus.  It is heavily reddened and notable for containing five red supergiants, the highest number known in any cluster until the end of the 20th century, but probably no blue supergiants.

Members
The brightest of the five red supergiants is the exceptionally cool MY Cephei. It has a spectral type of M7.5 which is one of the latest spectral types of any supergiant, although analysis is made difficult by the lack of comparable standard stars. MY Cephei is a semiregular variable star with a brightness range of magnitude 14.4 - 15.3.

The brightest hot stars in the cluster have a spectral type of BC2, indicating B2 stars with enhanced levels of carbon.  One has a bright giant luminosity class of II, while the other has a luminosity class of Ib-II, indicating it is either a bright giant or supergiant.  The hotter stars of the cluster are visually faint due to around six magnitudes of interstellar extinction.

The lack of blue supergiants, particularly in a cluster of just the right size and age to include five red supergiants, is unusual.  Such low ratios of blue:red supergiants occur in low metallicity clusters, but NGC 7419 is young and has near-solar metallicity.  Rapidly rotating stars may account for this evolutionary trend, encouraging high mass loss and rapid evolution of massive stars into red supergiants.  This conclusion is also consistent with the high proportion of Be stars in the cluster.

The age of the cluster is calculated to be  million years.

Non-members
Visible in the same field and as prominent as the red supergiants in infrared images is the carbon star MZ Cephei, which is much closer to us than NGC 7419. It is a slow irregular variable star with a range of 14.7 - 15.4.

The visually brightest star in the core region of the cluster is a yellow giant, placed at around 500 parsecs by Gaia astrometry.  The even brighter nearby star HD 216721 is also a foreground object.  Further out still from the centre of the cluster is the 7th magnitude eclipsing binary V453 Cephei, around 250 parsecs distant from us.

See also
Stephenson 2
RSGC1

References

External links

 

Cepheus (constellation)
7419
Open clusters